Fideris railway station is a railway station in the municipality of Fideris, in the Swiss canton of Grisons. It is an intermediate stop on the Rhaetian Railway  Landquart–Davos Platz line.

Services
The following local and regional trains call at Fideris:

 RegioExpress: Rush-hour only service to Landquart.
 Regio: Rush-hour service between Landquart and Davos Platz.

References

External links
 
 

Railway stations in Graubünden
Rhaetian Railway stations